Edwin Smith (11 June 1860 – 30 May 1939) was an English cricketer active in first-class cricket from 1886–1894, making nine appearances as a right-handed batsman and right-arm fast-medium bowler.

Smith made his debut in first-class cricket when he was selected to play for the Liverpool and District cricket team in 1886 against the touring Australians at Aigburth. He made eight further appearances in first-class cricket for Liverpool and District, with his final appearance coming against Cambridge University in 1894. He scored a total of 118 runs in his nine matches, averaged 8.42, with a high score of 32. With the ball he took 25 wickets, which came at a bowling average of 19.48, with one five wicket haul which resulted in his best figures of 7/59, which came against Yorkshire in 1891. Eight of his ten wickets in this match were England Test cricketers. He later made six appearances for Cheshire in the 1895 Minor Counties Championship.

He died at Ashby Magna, Leicestershire on 30 May 1939.

References

External links
Edwin Smith at ESPNcricinfo
Edwin Smith at CricketArchive

1860 births
1939 deaths
People from Harborough District
Cricketers from Leicestershire
English cricketers
Liverpool and District cricketers
Cheshire cricketers